Olli-Markus Taivainen (born May 2, 1989) is a Finnish ski-orienteering competitor and World Champion. He won a gold medal in the middle distance, a silver medal in the sprint and a bronze medal in the long distance at the 2009 World Ski Orienteering Championships.

He was featured as athlete of the month by the International Orienteering Federation in March 2011.

See also
 Finnish orienteers
 List of orienteers
 List of orienteering events

References

External links
 

1989 births
Living people
Finnish orienteers
Male orienteers
Ski-orienteers
Foot orienteers
Junior World Orienteering Championships medalists